Quincy Lee Taylor (born July 18, 1963) is an American former professional boxer who competed between 1986 to 2001. He held the WBC middleweight title from 1995 to 1996.

Professional career
Taylor, a southpaw, turned pro in 1986.  In 1987, he nearly KO´d Sugar Ray Leonard whilst sparring in preparation for Leonard's match against Marvin Hagler. In 1994, he landed a shot at WBC middleweight champion Julian Jackson. Taylor scored an upset TKO victory over Jackson, but lost the title in his next fight to Keith Holmes. After a two-year layoff and a victory in 1998, followed by a three-year layoff and a victory in 2001, Taylor retired from boxing. He coaches amateur boxers at the Boys and Girls Club and trains along with them.

Professional boxing record

See also
List of world middleweight boxing champions

References

External links

 

1963 births
Living people
American male boxers
Boxers from Texas
Sportspeople from Dallas
African-American boxers
Middleweight boxers
World middleweight boxing champions
World Boxing Council champions